The 2018–19 NC State Wolfpack women's basketball team represents North Carolina State University during the 2018–19 NCAA Division I women's basketball season. The Wolfpack, led by sixth-year head coach Wes Moore, play their home games at Reynolds Coliseum and were members of the Atlantic Coast Conference. They finished the season 28–6, 11–5 in ACC play to finish in a tie for third place. They advanced to the semifinals of the ACC women's tournament where they lost to Louisville. They received at-large bid of the NCAA women's tournament where they defeated Maine and Kentucky in the first and second rounds to advance to the sweet sixteen for the 2nd straight year where they lost to Iowa.

Previous season
They finished the 2017–18 season 26–9, 11–5 in ACC play to finish in a tie for fourth place. They advanced to the semifinals of the ACC women's tournament where they lost to Louisville. They received at-large bid of the NCAA women's tournament where they defeated Elon and Maryland in the first and second rounds before losing to Mississippi State in the sweet sixteen.

Off-season

Recruiting Class

Source:

Roster

Schedule

|-
!colspan=9 style="background:#E00000; color:white;"| Exhibition

|-
!colspan=9 style="background:#E00000; color:white;"| Non-conference regular season

|-
!colspan=9 style="background:#E00000; color:white;"| ACC regular season

|-
!colspan=9 style="background:#E00000; color:white;"| ACC Women's Tournament

|-
!colspan=9 style=| NCAA Women's Tournament

Source

Rankings

The Coaches Poll releases a final poll after the NCAA tournament, but the AP Poll does not release a poll at this time.

References

NC State Wolfpack women's basketball seasons
NC State
NC State